Family Dollar Stores, Inc. is an American variety store chain. With over 8,000 locations in all states except Alaska and Hawaii, it was the second largest retailer of its type in the United States until it was acquired by Dollar Tree in 2015 and its headquarters operations were moved from Matthews, a suburb of Charlotte, North Carolina, to Chesapeake, Virginia, located in South Hampton Roads. 

In June 2014, activist investor and major shareholder Carl Icahn demanded that Family Dollar be immediately put up for sale.

On July 28, 2014, Dollar Tree announced that it would buy Family Dollar for $8.5 billion. The sale delivered a windfall to the company's biggest shareholder Carl Icahn, who acquired his 9.4 percent stake in June 2014. On January 22, 2015, Family Dollar shareholders approved the Dollar Tree bid.

History

Family Dollar was founded in 1959 by Leon Levine, a 21-year-old entrepreneur. In November of that year, the company's first store was opened, in Charlotte, North Carolina. In 1961, their first store in South Carolina opened, followed by stores in Georgia and Virginia, which were opened in 1962 and 1965, respectively. During the 1960s, the store company was largely a southern United States operation. By 1969, there were fifty stores in Charlotte alone.

The 1970s were growing years for the store chain. In 1970, Family Dollar's stock went public for the first time, at $14.50 per share. In 1971, the chain's 100th store opened, followed by their 200th in 1974 and their 300th in 1978. Also in 1974, a distribution center was opened in Matthews, North Carolina. In 1979, Family Dollar stock began trading at the New York Stock Exchange.

In 1981, the chain's 400th store was opened, followed by a 500th store in 1982 and a 700th in 1983. The 1980s saw expansion at a wider scale for the company, and by 1989, 1,500 stores were operating.

The 1990s saw the pace of expansion slow down compared to the 1980s, with 1,000 stores opened. The company opened distribution centers in West Memphis, Arkansas; Front Royal, Virginia and Duncan, Oklahoma. Since 2000, the pace of growth increased significantly, with the addition of about 3,500 new stores, and new distribution centers opening in Morehead, Kentucky; Maquoketa, Iowa; Odessa, Texas; Marianna, Florida; and Rome, New York.

In 2001, Family Dollar joined the S&P 500 stock market index. In 2002, the company joined the Fortune 500 list of largest publicly held companies.

When Leon Levine retired in 2003, his son Howard R. Levine succeeded him as Chairman and CEO, keeping this multibillion-dollar company in the family.

In March 2005, Family Dollar restated the company's fiscal 2000 to fiscal 2004 earnings per share downward by 2 cents to 3 cents a year, to correct lease-accounting issues.

As of August 2011, there were 7,000 stores in 44 states. According to their website in 2005, Family Dollar opened 500 new stores, 350 more in 2006, and an additional 300 in 2007. According to the Company's 2013 Corporate Profile in 2010, Family Dollar opened 200 new stores, 300 more in 2011, 475 in 2012, and an additional 500 in 2013. On October 3, 2012, Family Dollar said they will open 500 stores in 2013. The next day, Family Dollar partnered with Healthways. Family Dollar operates 11 distribution centers - the latest of which opened in St. George, Utah on October 16, 2013.

Family Dollar created a game show based on the store in late 2016. Hosted by celebrity chef Pat Neely, the show Save to Win aired on The CW between 2016 and 2017.

In May 2020, eight Family Dollar stores were damaged by rioting and looting during the George Floyd protests in Minneapolis–Saint Paul, with two locations being destroyed by arson during the widespread civil unrest.

In February 2022 Family Dollar temporarily closed 400 stores in Alabama, Arkansas, Louisiana, Mississippi, Missouri, and Tennessee and recalled certain products purchased from Jan. 1, 2021, through the present after the FDA found unsanitary conditions, including a rodent infestation, at the company’s distribution center in West Memphis, Arkansas. On May 18, 2022, the company announced that the West Memphis distribution center would be shut down permanently on or before July 17, 2022 with over 300 employees affected.

Selling pressure
In March 2011, Family Dollar rejected a takeover offer by Nelson Peltz's Trian Fund Management reportedly between $55 and $60 a share.

On June 6, 2014, activist investor Carl Icahn disclosed that his firm, Icahn Enterprises, held a 9.4% stake in Family Dollar. On June 19, 2014, Icahn demanded in an open letter that Family Dollar be put up for sale immediately. Goldman Sachs and other analysts had identified a number of potential buyers.

As of June 19, 2014, 22% of Family Dollar's shares were controlled by activist investors.

Acquisition by Dollar Tree
On July 28, 2014, Dollar Tree announced that it would acquire Family Dollar for $74.50 per share, a deal valuing Family Dollar at $8.5 billion, and that Dollar Tree would also assume $1 billion in debt currently owed by Family Dollar, for a total of $9.5 billion. Dollar Tree CEO Bob Sasser said that Family Dollar CEO Howard R. Levine will remain with the company following the merger and will be appointed to Dollar Tree's board of directors. Dollar General entered the bidding, shortly thereafter, surpassing Dollar Tree's offer on August 18, 2014, $78.50 a share compared to Dollar Tree's offer of $74.50 a share. The enterprise value of the Dollar General bid was $9.7 billion compared to that of Dollar Tree of $9.2 billion, while the quantum return to shareholders was varying as the stock and cash deal valuation was subjected to fluctuations of price of the competing bidders stock. On August 20, 2014, Family Dollar rejected the Dollar General bid, saying it was not a matter of price, but concerns over antitrust issues that had convinced the company and its advisers that the deal could not be concluded on the terms proposed. Days after, Dollar General CEO Rick Dreiling sent a letter to the Family Dollar board of directors claiming that Levine rejected merger requests to protect his job. Levine, in a statement, said the Family Dollar board had been analyzing potential antitrust issues that could arise from doing a deal with Dollar General since the start of the year, and that was the reason it was not accepting the Dollar General bid.

On January 22, 2015, Family Dollar shareholders approved the Dollar Tree bid.

Several stores were required to be sold as a condition of the sale. Sycamore Partners acquired the stores in 2014 under the corporate name Dollar Express. The stores continued to operate under the Family Dollar name. In 2017, Dollar General acquired Dollar Express and converted the stores.

As a result of Family Dollar's sale to Dollar Tree, some Family Dollar stores have opened in the same plaza, and at times even next door to Dollar Tree locations. On March 6, 2019, the retailer announced that it will close up to 400 stores nationwide due to heavy pressure from an activist investor. Most store locations were either shut down entirely or replaced with Dollar Tree stores.

The company has deployed a newer store format known as "H2" in new and renovated locations, which have a larger focus on groceries and incorporate Dollar Tree merchandise. The company has also deployed co-branded Family Dollar/Dollar Tree stores in smaller markets.

References

External links

Companies formerly listed on the New York Stock Exchange
Discount stores of the United States
Companies based in Charlotte, North Carolina
Retail companies established in 1959
Variety stores
Companies based in North Carolina
1959 establishments in North Carolina
2015 mergers and acquisitions
American companies established in 1959
1970s initial public offerings
Mecklenburg County, North Carolina